Frank John Lobert (November 26, 1883 – May 29, 1932) was a Major League Baseball first baseman who played for the Baltimore Terrapins of the Federal League in .

He was the brother of fellow major leaguer Hans Lobert, and cousin of Joe Schultz, Sr., and his son Joe Schultz, Jr.

External links

1883 births
1932 deaths
Major League Baseball third basemen
Baltimore Terrapins players
Baseball players from Pennsylvania
Sportspeople from Williamsport, Pennsylvania
Kalamazoo Kazoos players
Hartford Senators players
Kewanee Boilermakers players
Lancaster Lanks players
Newark Newks players
New Castle Nocks players
Sharon Travelers players